General Hatch may refer to:

Edward Hatch (1832–1889), Union Army brevet major general
Everard Enos Hatch (1859–1940), U.S. Army brigadier general
Henry J. Hatch (born 1935), U.S. Army lieutenant general
Henry James Hatch (1869–1931), U.S. Army brigadier general
John Porter Hatch (1822–1901), Union Army brevet major general
Monroe W. Hatch Jr. (born 1933), U.S. Air Force four-star general